Antoine Pano, born in Beirut on 10 November 1952, is a Lebanese politician and retired general in the Lebanese Armed Forces and special forces.

He represented the Free Patriotic Movement for the parliamentary elections, and won election on May 6, 2018.

He was a member of the Parliament of Lebanon representing the minorities for the Beirut I area

References 

Lebanese military personnel
Politicians from Beirut
Free Patriotic Movement politicians
Members of the Parliament of Lebanon
1952 births
Living people
Syriac Orthodox Christians
Eastern Orthodox Christians from Lebanon